Lomelí is a surname. Notable people with the surname include:

Carlos Lomelí Bolaños (born 1959), Mexican politician
Jesús Lomelí (born 1953), Mexican politician
José Lomelí (born 1994), Mexican footballer
Luis Felipe Lomelí (born 1975), Mexican writer and poet